Cobra Group may refer to:

Cobra Group (infrastructure company), a spain infrastructure company
Cobra Group (company), a direct-sales company
COBRA (avant-garde movement), an art movement also known as Cobra group